The Mauá Hydroelectric Plant, is a dam and hydroelectric power plant on the Tibagi River near Telêmaco Borba and Ortigueira in Paraná, Brazil.

See also

List of power stations in Brazil

References

External links 
 Consórcio Energético Cruzeiro do Sul 

Dams completed in 2012
Energy infrastructure completed in 2012
Dams in Paraná (state)
Hydroelectric power stations in Paraná (state)
Gravity dams
Telêmaco Borba
Roller-compacted concrete dams